The 2008 United States presidential election in Oregon took place on November 4, 2008, and was part of the 2008 United States presidential election. Voters chose seven representatives, or electors to the Electoral College, who voted for president and vice president.

Oregon was won by Democratic nominee Barack Obama with a 16.4% margin of victory, making him the first successful Democrat since Lyndon B. Johnson in 1964 to win over 50% of the state’s votes. Prior to the election, all 17 news organizations considered this a state Obama would win, or otherwise considered as a safe blue state. Situated on the West Coast, which has become a reliably Democratic stronghold, Oregon is a relatively blue state. The last Republican presidential nominee to carry Oregon was Ronald Reagan in his 1984 landslide reelection. Although George W. Bush came close in both 2000 and 2004 (with Al Gore winning by 0.54 percentage points in 2000 and John Kerry by 4.16 percentage points in 2004), Republicans have not seriously contested the state since. This is also the first time that a presidential candidate won more than a million votes in Oregon.

, this is the most recent election in which Jackson County and Wasco County voted for a Democratic presidential candidate, and the last time any Southern Oregon county sided with a Democrat. It’s also the last election that Oregon voted to the right of Michigan. Marion County, which sided with Obama, would not vote Democratic again until 2020.

Primaries
 2008 Oregon Democratic presidential primary
 2008 Oregon Republican presidential primary

Campaign

Predictions
There were 16 news organizations who made state-by-state predictions of the election. Here are their last predictions before election day:

Polling

Obama won every single pre-election poll. Since September 22, Obama won each by a double-digit margin of victory and at least 52% of the vote. The final 3 polls showed Obama leading 55% to 41%.

Fundraising
McCain raised a total of $1,258,426 in the state. Obama raised $6,660,622.

Advertising and visits
Obama and his interest groups spent $1,194,908. McCain and his interest groups spent just $159,222. Neither campaign visited the state.

Analysis
Voters in Oregon have a strong penchant for advancing the protection of civil liberties and individual freedoms, liberal values that have given Democrats a big edge in the state in recent years. The state once leaned Republican, like most of the Pacific Northwest. It only went Democratic once from 1948 to 1984—during Lyndon Johnson's 44-state landslide of 1964. However, the state has gone Democratic in every election since 1988, and along with California and Washington it is reckoned as forming a solid bloc of blue states along the Pacific Coast.

On Election Day, Obama carried the state by 16.35 points. As Oregon was expected to be easily won by Obama, it was called for him as soon as the polls in the state closed. Besides Jackson County in the southwest and Wasco County in the central third, most rural counties in Oregon favored McCain in the 2008 election. Nevertheless, Obama performed much better in these regions than John Kerry had in 2004. Ultimately, Obama's strong support in the more urban Willamette Valley, home to two-thirds of the state's population, would have allowed him to win the state decisively in any event, coupled with the counties making up the northern half of the Oregon Coast. The state remains geographically and politically divided by the Cascade Mountains, with eastern Oregon and the southwest being more rural, less populated and therefore strongly Republican, while the Willamette Valley is more urbanized and therefore strongly Democratic. These two areas compose the core of each party's votes: rural Oregon is strongly Republican and culturally similar to Idaho, while the Willamette Valley—especially the cities of Portland and Eugene—heavily favors the Democrats. While Republicans typically win more counties due to running up large margins in the east and southwest, Democrats typically win the state because the Willamette Valley has more people. In 2008, Obama's overwhelming margins in Portland and Eugene, combined with strong support from Portland's suburbs (which function as swing counties), enabled him to win a landslide in a structurally liberal state. Although Obama broke no decades-long Republican county streaks, he came within 0.49 percent of winning Polk County and 1.36 percent of winning Yamhill County, neither of which have voted for a Democratic presidential candidate since 1968. While not having carried Deschutes County, Obama was only 0.31 percent away from winning it. Prior to Joe Biden in 2020, this was the closest a Democratic candidate came to winning Deschutes County after the 1992 presidential election.

During the same election, Democratic Speaker of the Oregon House of Representatives Jeff Merkley defeated incumbent Republican U.S. Senator Gordon Smith by a narrow 3.35% margin. Merkley received 48.90 percent of the vote while Smith took in 45.55 percent, with the remaining 5.24 percent going to Dave Brownlow of the Constitution Party. At the state level, Democrats picked up five seats in the Oregon House of Representatives while Republicans picked up one seat in the Oregon Senate.

Results

Results by county

Counties that flipped from Republican to Democratic
 Clackamas (largest city: Lake Oswego)
 Jackson (largest city: Medford)
 Marion (largest city: Salem)
 Tillamook (largest city: Tillamook)
 Wasco (largest city: The Dalles)

Results by congressional district
Barack Obama carried four of the state’s five congressional districts in Oregon, all held by Democrats.

Electors

Technically the voters of Oregon cast their ballots for electors: representatives to the Electoral College. Oregon is allocated 7 electors because it has 5 congressional districts and 2 senators. All candidates who appear on the ballot or qualify to receive write-in votes must submit a list of 7 electors, who pledge to vote for their candidate and his or her running mate. Whoever wins the majority of votes in the state is awarded all 7 electoral votes. Their chosen electors then vote for president and vice president. Although electors are pledged to their candidate and running mate, they are not obligated to vote for them. An elector who votes for someone other than his or her candidate is known as a faithless elector.

The electors of each state and the District of Columbia met on December 15, 2008, to cast their votes for president and vice president. The Electoral College itself never meets as one body. Instead the electors from each state and the District of Columbia met in their respective capitols.

The following were the members of the Electoral College from the state. All 7 were pledged to Barack Obama and Joe Biden:
Michael Bohan
Shirley Cairns
Joe Smith
John McColgan
Meredith Wood Smith
Frank James Dixon
Bernard Gorter

See also
 United States presidential elections in Oregon
 Presidency of Barack Obama

References

Oregon
2008
Presidential